Juan Sebastián Molano Benavides (born 11 April 1994) is a Colombian professional racing cyclist, who currently rides for UCI WorldTeam . He was named in the startlist for the 2017 Vuelta a España. In May 2019, he was named in the startlist for the 2019 Giro d'Italia.

While riding the 2019 Giro d'Italia, Molano was suspended by his team following stage 3 after "seemingly unusual physiological results". The team did not comment where these results originated from and refrained from commenting further until more tests were carried out. Molano did not start stage 4. Molano was later cleared to resume racing at the Adriatica Ionica Race in late-July 2019 after further tests found he was "highly sensitive to altitude changes."

In June 2022, Molano was disqualified from the Critérium du Dauphiné after he punched Hugo Page in the head.

Major results

2014
 Pan American Track Championships
1st  Omnium
1st  Team pursuit
2016
 1st Stage 1 Vuelta a la Comunidad de Madrid
 1st Stage 4 Vuelta a Colombia
2017
 Volta ao Alentejo
1st Stages 3 & 5
 3rd  Road race, Pan American Road Championships
 3rd Grand Prix de Denain
2018
 1st  Road race, Pan American Road Championships
 1st  Overall Tour of China I
1st  Points classification
1st Stage 2
 Tour of Xingtai
1st Stages 2 & 3
 1st Stage 2 Tour of China II
 10th Overall Tour of Taihu Lake
1st  Points classification
1st Stages 1 & 2
2019
 1st Stage 3 Tour Colombia
2020
 Tour Colombia
1st  Points classification
1st Stages 2, 3 & 5
2021
 Vuelta a Burgos
1st  Points classification
1st Stages 2 & 4
 Giro di Sicilia
1st  Points classification
1st Stages 1 & 2
 7th Coppa Bernocchi
2022
 1st Stage 21 Vuelta a España
 1st Stage 4 Boucles de la Mayenne
 2nd Trofeo Playa de Palma
 5th Clásica de Almería
2023
 1st Grand Prix de Denain
 1st Stage 4 UAE Tour
 5th Trofeo Palma
 7th Bredene Koksijde Classic
 10th Clásica de Almería

Grand Tour general classification results timeline

References

External links
 

1994 births
Living people
Colombian male cyclists
Place of birth missing (living people)
Sportspeople from Boyacá Department
Colombian Vuelta a España stage winners
21st-century Colombian people